The 2007 Air Force Falcons football team represented the United States Air Force Academy in the 2007 NCAA Division I-A football season. Led by first year head coach Troy Calhoun, they played their home games at Falcon Stadium as a member of the Mountain West Conference. They finished the season 9–4, 6–2 in Mountain West play to finish in second place. They were invited to the Armed Forces Bowl where they lost to California.

Schedule

Roster

Coaching staff

Game summaries

South Carolina State

Utah

TCU

BYU

Navy

UNLV

Colorado State

Wyoming

New Mexico

Army

Notre Dame

San Diego State

Armed Forces Bowl

References

Air Force
Air Force Falcons football seasons
Air Force Falcons football